The 1962 FIBA European Champions Cup Final was a championship 1961–62 season EuroLeague Finals basketball game that was held in Patinoire des Vernets, Geneva, Switzerland, on the 29 June 1962, that saw Dinamo Tbilisi defeat Real Madrid, by a score 90-83, in front of 5,000 spectators, to claim its first, and to this day, only ever EuroLeague title. It was also the first title game that was ever decided by a single game that was played on a neutral court. Only one game on a neutral court was played, due to the unstable political situation that existed at the time.

Box score

Awards

FIBA European Champions Cup Finals Top Scorer 
  Wayne Hightower ( Real Madrid)

See also 
 FIBA European Champions Cup 1961–62

References 

1961–62 in European basketball
1961–62 in Spanish basketball
International basketball competitions hosted by Switzerland
Real Madrid Baloncesto games
1961–62
BC Dinamo Tbilisi
Sports competitions in Geneva
1962 in Swiss sport
20th century in Geneva